Chaldal.com (Bengali: চালডাল.কম), founded in 2013, is a grocery e-commerce platform in Bangladesh. The company offers its services via a website and mobile apps for Android and iOS. “Chaldal” is a Bengali word colloquially used to refer to "groceries" (Chal means Rice, and Dal means Pulses). Chaldal started as an online grocery service provider and has since gone on to redefine supply chains, ease commodity trade, support refugee camps, and reduce food wastage by building technology into the supply chain, all the way back to the farms.  

Chaldal operates in Dhaka, Narayanganj, Chittagong, Jashore, Khulna, Sylhet, and Rajshahi. As of February 2022, it has a total of 28 active warehouses.

Description
Chaldal was founded by Waseem Alim (Founder and CEO), Zia Ashraf (Founder and COO), and Tejas Viswanath (Founder and CTO). The company initially started with one warehouse/ office in Gulshan, Dhaka while offering next day delivery.

In 2017, Chaldal received financing from IFC (International Finance Corporation), World Bank. The company has also received funding from other private, national and international venture capitalists through different series of investments.

Chaldal has a website and Android and iOS app for smartphone users where users can order products. Orders can also be phoned in. Customers can choose their preferred time slots for delivery.

Warehouses
To ensure one-hour delivery, Chaldal maintains 25 different micro warehouses across Dhaka, Chattogram, Narayanganj, and Jashore. In Dhaka, the warehouses are situated in Hajaribag, Banani, Rajarbag, Mirpur, Uttara, Dhalibari, Kallyanpur, Rampura, Jatrabari, Fakirbari, Panthapath, Mohammadpur, Badda, Uttar khan, and Shewrapara. Its primary warehouse is in Rampura. The company also maintains a perishables processing warehouse in Mohakhali for its vegetables, dairy, fruits, etc.

Achievement
In 2020 Chaldal was announced as the best e-commerce company of the year at Digital World 2020 for serving its customers loyally during the COVID-19 crisis. It was ranked ninth in the world's best 500 startups in 2015. The ranking was produced by Forbes Magazine's startup assister ‘Y Combinator’. It has also received The Daily Star E-Business Of The Year 2017. Its name comes up in FT/IFC Transformation Business Award 2018.

References

External links
 
 
 The 10 Best Online Grocery Shops In Bangladesh

Online grocers
Retail companies established in 2013
Internet properties established in 2013
Online retailers of Bangladesh
Y Combinator companies